Melanie Paschke (born 29 June 1970 in Braunschweig) is a retired German sprinter, who specialised in the 100 metres, 200 metres and 4 × 100 metres relay.

Biography
Her personal best time in the 100 m is 11.04 seconds, achieved in June 1995 in Bremen. This places her tenth on the German all-time list, behind Marlies Göhr, Marita Koch, Silke Gladisch, Katrin Krabbe, Heike Drechsler, Bärbel Wöckel, Annegret Richter, Romy Müller, Monika Hamann, Inge Helten and Ingrid Auerswald.

Paschke competed for the clubs LG Braunschweig and TV Wattenscheid 01 during her active career.

Achievements

See also
 German all-time top lists - 100 metres

References

External links 
 

1970 births
Living people
Sportspeople from Braunschweig
LG Braunschweig athletes
TV Wattenscheid athletes
German female sprinters
German national athletics champions
Olympic athletes of Germany
Athletes (track and field) at the 1996 Summer Olympics
World Athletics Championships medalists
World Athletics Indoor Championships medalists
European Athletics Championships medalists
Universiade medalists in athletics (track and field)
Universiade gold medalists for Germany
World Athletics Championships winners
Medalists at the 1995 Summer Universiade
Olympic female sprinters